Abyssotrophon is a genus of sea snails, marine gastropod mollusks in the family Muricidae, the murex snails or rock snails.

Species
Species within the genus Abyssotrophon include:

Abyssotrophon christae Egorov, 1993
Abyssotrophon crystallinus (Kuroda, 1953)
Abyssotrophon delicatus (Kuroda, 1953)
Abyssotrophon drygalskii (Thiele, 1912)
Abyssotrophon edzoevi Egorov, 1994
Abyssotrophon hadalis (Sysoev, 1992)
Abyssotrophon hubbsi (Rokop, 1972)
Abyssotrophon ivanovi Egorov, 1993
Abyssotrophon lorenzoensis (Durham, 1942)
Abyssotrophon minimus (Okutani, 1964)
Abyssotrophon multicostatus Golikov & Sirenko, 1992
Abyssotrophon odisseyi (Golikov & Sirenko, 1992)
Abyssotrophon panamensis (Dall, 1902)
Abyssotrophon ruthenicus Egorov, 1993
Abyssotrophon soyoae (Okutani, 1959)
Abyssotrophon teratus Egorov, 1993
 Species brought into synonymy 
Abyssotrophon convexus Egorov, 1994: synonym of Abyssotrophon delicatus (Kuroda, 1953)  
Abyssotrophon longisiphon Egorov, 1993 : synonym of Abyssotrophon soyoae (Okutani, 1959)
Abyssotrophon tricostatus Egorov, 1993 : synonym of Abyssotrophon soyoae (Okutani, 1959)
Abyssotrophon unicus Egorov, 1993 : synonym of Abyssotrophon delicatus (Kuroda, 1953)

References

 
Gastropod genera